The East Germany women's national football team was in 1990 the women's football team of East Germany.

History

Competitive record

European Championship

Squad
None of the capped players went on to represent the Germany national team following reunification. However, Birte Weiß, who was in the squad but did not make an appearance, would go on to be capped twice for Germany.

Players
Below is a list of the 14 players who were capped for East Germany in their only match. Players in italics were substitutes.

None of the players managed to score a goal in the match.

Coaches
 1990: Bernd Schröder

See also

 Women's football in East Germany

References

External links
 MDR gallery on the team

 
Former national association football teams in Europe
European women's national association football teams